Heraclius (626 – 642), known by the diminutive Heraclonas or Heracleonas, and sometimes called Heraclius II, was the son of Heraclius and his niece Martina. His father had stipulated in his will that both of his sons, Heraclonas and Constantine III, should rule jointly upon his death. Heraclius also specified that his wife, Martina, was to be called "Mother and Empress" insofar as she might have influence at court as well. The emperor Heraclius died in February 641 from edema. When Martina made the late Emperor's will public she faced staunch resistance to her playing any active role in government, but both Heraclonas and Constantine were proclaimed joint-emperors in February 641 without incident. After Constantine died of tuberculosis in May 641, Heraclonas became sole emperor, under the regency of his mother due to his young age.  He reigned until October or November 641, when he was overthrown by Valentinus, a general and usurper of Armenian extract, who installed Constans II, the son of Constantine III. Valentinus had Heraclonas' nose cut off, then exiled him to Rhodes, where he is believed to have died in the following year.

Early life and family
Heraclonas was born in 626, in the suburban Palace of Sophianae. He was the son of Emperor Heraclius, and his niece-wife Martina, and was born while Heraclius campaigned in the east against the Persians.

Under Heraclius, the Byzantine Empire was invaded in 639 by the Arabs, due to the failure of the Theme of Mesopotamia to pay tribute. The cities of Edessa and Dara were quickly captured. In the same year, another group of Arabs, led by 'Amr ibn al-'As, invaded Byzantine Egypt. He quickly occupied the coastal towns of Egypt, but was unable to cross the Nile, due to stiff resistance by Byzantine forces led by John. After a bloody battle between John and 'Amr, in which John perished, 'Amr was forced to appeal to the Rashidun Caliph Umar for more troops. John was replaced by another general, Theodore, who gathered his forces around Babylon Fortress, a major fortress in Egypt. By summer 640, 'Amr's forces had swelled to around 15,000 men. With these men, 'Amr decisively defeated Theodore north of Babylon, before laying siege to the fortress itself.

Life
A description of the ceremony is preserved in De Ceremoniis which says that the kamelaukion (caesar cap) of Heraclonas was removed from his head and replaced with the imperial crown. The same kamelaukion was then placed on David's head.

Heraclius died of edema on 11 February 641, leaving the Empire jointly to his eldest son, Constantine III, and Heraclonas, who were both proclaimed emperor in late May 641. At the time of his elevation to co-emperor, Heraclonas was only 15 years old, whereas Constantine was 28, which effectively gave the real power to Constantine. Much of the Byzantine public objected to Heraclius will, as Heraclonas was the result of an avunculate marriage—a marriage between an uncle and niece—which many felt was illegal, thereby making Heraclonas a bastard. Also considered objectionable was the fact that Constantine's ten-year-old son, Constans II, was not elevated alongside Constantine and Heraclonas, breaking the tradition of the succession of senior emperorship from father to eldest son, when possible. It was also thought that the lack of elevation could have precluded him from the succession entirely. 

Shortly after Constantine took the throne, he was informed by his finance minister, Philagrius, that Heraclius had created a secret fund for Martina, administered by Patriarch Pyrrhus. Constantine confiscated this account, using it to help meet the budget for the spring military payroll, which, along with the traditional accessional donatives that comprised half of the payroll, totaled 2,016,000 nomisma. Constantine appointed Valentinus as the commander of the main eastern army, in the hopes of retaining at least the Egyptian coastline. However the Byzantine general Theodore was still unable to repel the Arab attacks. Constantine summoned Cyrus of Alexandria, made him Prefect of Egypt, and instructed him to prepare to reinforce Alexandria. Before this invasion could take place, Babylon surrendered to the Arabs, allowing them to besiege Alexandria. 

Heraclius will also stated that Martina should serve as mother and empress-regent (sharing significant power), but this part was rejected by the Senate. Because of Heraclonas young age, Martina ruled through him, consistently opposing the policies of Constantine, leading to the creation of two different political factions. Constantine's faction was initially the more powerful of the two, but this control was weakened by a flagging economy and the loss of Egypt to the Arabs. Shortly after, on 25 May 641, Constantine died of an advanced case of tuberculosis, although some supporters of Constantine alleged Martina had him poisoned, leaving Heraclonas as the sole ruler, under the regency of Martina.

Sole rule and fall

Martina maintained the plans of Constantine, and sent Cyrus to Alexandria, with much of the praesental army. She then summoned the Thracian army to Constantinople, to replace them. Around this time, the Patriarch Pyrrhus, an influential advisor of Martina, succeeded in reviving the policy of Monothelitism. As a result of this policy, Kyros, a monothelete, regained control of the see of Alexandria, giving him both religious and secular control. Martina instructed Kyros to attempt to negotiate with the Arabs, as they believed that they were unable to defeat them militarily. Kyros met with 'Amr at the Babylon Fortress and there agreed upon the surrender of Egypt.

Martina was opposed by Valentinus, who was beyond her reach in Anatolia, although she exiled his patron, Philagrius, to Africa. Heraclonas and Martina lost the support of the Byzantine Senate and people due to the rumors that Martina had poisoned Constantine and their support for Monothelitism. Also at this time, both Heraclonas and Martina's relations with the army suffered as a result of Martina's inability to raise enough funds to match the donative given by Constantine.

In August 641, Valentinus marched his troops to Chalcedon, to force Martina to elevate Constans II to co-emperor. While Valentinus was encamped across the Bosphorus from Constantinople, a mob rose up in the city, demanding that Pyrrhus crown Constans II as emperor, and then abdicate, to be replaced by his steward Paul II. Martina, now in a truly desperate situation, offered the military further donatives, recalled Philagrius from Africa, and offered Valentinus the title of Count of the Excubitors. In late September/October, Martina elevated Constans to co-emperor, but also crowned Heraclonas brothers, Martinos and David. Despite these offers, Valentinus entered the city in October/November, deposed Heraclonas and Martina, and then elevated Constans to emperor. Valentinus was unwilling to kill a woman and child, but had Martina's tongue slit and Heraclonas' nose cut off in January 642, then exiled them to Rhodes; this is believed to be the first time that the political mutilation of Byzantine prisoners was utilized to signify that the person could no longer hold political power. After this, nothing is known of them, although it is believed that Heraclonas died in 642, likely in Rhodes.

Notes

References

Ancient sources

Breviarium by Nikephoros I of Constantinople.

Chronographia by Theophanes the Confessor

Citations

Bibliography

External links

626 births
7th-century Byzantine emperors
Heraclian dynasty
Medieval child monarchs
Monarchs deposed as children
640s in the Byzantine Empire
Heraclius
Byzantine exiles
Sons of Byzantine emperors
Year of death unknown
642 deaths